Sharda Rajan Iyengar (born 25 October 1937), shortly Sharda, is an Indian playback singer in the 1960s and 1970s. She won the Filmfare Award for Best Female Playback Singer for the cabaret "Baat Zara Hai Aapas Ki" in Jahan Pyar Miley (1970), though she is most remembered for her song "Titli Udi" in Suraj (1966). In 2007, she released the album Andaaz-e-Bayan Aur, featuring her own compositions based on Mirza Ghalib's ghazals.

Early life

Sharda was from an Iyengar family from Tamil Nadu, India and was inclined towards music from childhood. She has the distinction of being a BA graduate.

Career

Early in her career Sharda was offered a voice test by Raj Kapoor when he first heard her singing in a function at Shrichand Ahuja's residence in Tehran. She got her first big break in Bollywood with the song "Titli Udi" in Suraj (1966). She was promoted by Shankar of the Shankar Jaikishan duo.

"Titli udi" turned out to be a top chartbuster in 1966. It so happens that the coveted Filmfare award for best playback singer had only one category (either male or female) until 1966. "Titli Udi" song, however, was tied as best song with Mohd Rafi's song "Baharo Phool Barsao" which had never happened before. Sharda didn't win the award but from then on Filmfare started giving two awards for best playback singer: one for male singer and the other for female singer. Thus Sharda made history. Thereafter Sharda was nominated four years in a row (1968–71) for best female playback singer and won another Filmfare award. In a short span Sharda won two Filmfare awards, when the Mangeshkar Sisters were dominating. Thereafter she continued singing for Shankar in nearly all of his films until his death. Her voice was last heard in Kaanch Ki Deewar (1986).

She sang with most of the top singers like Mohd Rafi, Asha Bhosle, Kishore Kumar, Yesudas, Mukesh and Suman Kalyanpur. She lent her voice to leading ladies of the time like Vyjayanthimala, Sadhana, Saira Banu, Hema Malini, Sharmila Tagore, Mumtaz, Rekha and Helen. Besides Shankar she recorded songs with Usha Khanna, Ravi, Dattaram, Iqbal Qureshi and a few others. She was the first Indian female singer to cut her own pop album in India, called Sizzlers in 1971 which was launched by HMV.

Original music

On 21 July 2007 Sharda released her Ghazal album Andaaz-e-Bayan Aur, a compilation of Mirza Ghalib's ghazals. The album was released at Juhu Jagriti Mumbai at the hands of actress Shabana Azmi. Music Director Khayyam was present at the release party, where Sharda thrilled the audience by singing a few songs from the album in her well-preserved voice.

Shankar composed a song "Ek Chehra jo Dil Ke Kareeb" for a film called Garam Khoon (1980), sung by Lata Mangeshkar which was penned by Sharda under name Singaar and picturised on Sulakshana Pandit.

She turned Music Director in the mid-1970s and gave music for films like Maa Behen Aur Biwi, Tu Meri Main Tera, Kshitij, Mandir Masjid and Maila Anchal. Mohd Rafi was nominated for Filmfare Best Male Playback Singer Award for the song "Achcha Hi Hua Dil Toot Gaya" from Maa Behen Aur Biwi (1974), which he sang under Sharda's music direction.

Popular songs
 "Titli udi" (Suraj)
 "Dekho mera dil machal gaya" (Suraj)
 "Baat Zara Hai Aapas Ki" (Jahan Pyar Miley, 1970, Filmware Award Winner)
 "Aa Aayega kaun yahan" (Gumnaam)
 "Jaan e Chaman Shola badan" (Gumnaam) – with Mohd Rafi
"Masti Aur Jawani Ho Umar Badi Mastani Ho" (Dil Daulat Duniya) – With Kishore Kumar & Asha Bhosle
 "Jigar ka dard badhta ja raha hai" (Street Singer) - with Mohd Rafi
 "Bakkamma-2 Bakkamma-2 Ekkada Potao Ra" (Shatranj) - with Mohd Rafi and Mehmood
 "Leja Leja Leja mera dil" (An Evening in Paris)
 "Chale jana zara thhahro" (Around The World) – with Mukesh
 "Tum Pyar se dekho" (Sapno Ka Saudagar) – with Mukesh
 "Duniya ki sair kar lo" (Around The World) - with Mukesh
 "Woh Pari kahan se laun" (Pehchan) – with Mukesh and Suman Kalyanpur
 "Kisike dil ko sanam" (Kal Aaj Aur Kal)
 "Jab bhi yeh dil udaas hota hai" (Seema) – with Mohd Rafi
 "Aap ki Rai Mere Baare Mein kya hai kahiye" (Elaan) – with Mohd Rafi
 "Jane Anjane Yahan sabhi hain Deewane" (Jane Anjane)
 "Jaane bhi De Sanam Mujhe, abhi jaane..." (Around the World)
 "Man ke panchhi kaheen duur chal, duur chal" ("Naina")
 "Wahi Pyar Ke Khuda Hum Jin Pe Fida" ( "Paapi Pet Ka Sawal Hai" 1984 )
 Tera ang ka rang  hai anguri (Chanda aur Bijli) 
 Yeh muh aur massur ki dhal (Around the world) with Mubarak Begum
 Humko tou barbad kiya hay aur kisey barbad karogey (Gunahon ka Devta 1967) - with Mohd. Rafi
 Sunn sunn re balam, dil tujhko pukarey (Pyar Mohabbat 1968)

Telugu songs
 "Kanti Choopu Cheputondi" (Jeevitha Chakram)
 “Madhurathi madhuram “(Jeevitha Chakram) - with Ghantasala

References

External links
 Sharda website
 

Living people
Bollywood playback singers
Indian women playback singers
Women musicians from Tamil Nadu
1937 births
20th-century Indian women singers
20th-century Indian singers
Singers from Tamil Nadu
Filmfare Awards winners